Vanina (German:Vanina oder Die Galgenhochzeit) is a 1922 German silent historical film directed by Arthur von Gerlach and starring Asta Nielsen, Paul Wegener and Paul Hartmann.

The art direction was by Walter Reimann. It was shot at the Tempelhof Studios in Berlin.

Cast
 Asta Nielsen as Vanina  
 Paul Wegener as Gouverneur von Turin  
 Paul Hartmann as Octavio 
 Albrecht Viktor Blum as Adjutant des Gouverneurs  
 Bernhard Goetzke as the Priest  
 Raoul Lange as the Hangman

References

Bibliography
 Eric Rentschler. German Film & Literature. Routledge, 2013.

External links

1922 films
Films of the Weimar Republic
German silent feature films
UFA GmbH films
Films based on works by Stendhal
Films set in Italy
Films set in the 1820s
Films with screenplays by Carl Mayer
German black-and-white films
German historical films
1920s historical films
Films shot at Tempelhof Studios
1920s German films